Bukomansimbi is a town in the  Central Region of Uganda. It is the chief municipal, administrative, and commercial center of Bukomansimbi District and the site of the district headquarters.

Location
Bukomansimbi is on the main highway between Masaka and Sembabule.

The coordinates of the town are 0°10'00.0"S, 31°37'07.0"E (Latitude:-0.166667; Longitude:31.618600).

Population
, local sources estimated the population of the town as "less than 10,000".

In 2015, the Uganda Bureau of Statistics (UBOS) estimated the population of the town at 9,700 inhabitants. In 2020, the population agency estimated the mid-year population of Bukomansimbi Town Council at 10,000. Of that number, 5,100 (51 percent) were female and 4,900 (49 percent) were male. UBOS also calculated that the population of the town had increased at an average rate of 0.61 percent annually, between 2015 and 2020.

Points of interest
The following additional points of interest lie within the town limits or close to its borders:
(a) The offices of Bukomansimbi Town Council (b) Bukomansimbi central market, the largest source of fresh produce in the town (c) Kitanda Health Center III, a health facility administered by the Uganda Ministry of Health (d) the Masaka–Villa Maria–Bukomansimbi–Sembabule Road passes through the western neighborhoods of the town.

See also
 List of roads in Uganda
 List of cities and towns in Uganda

References

Populated places in Central Region, Uganda
Cities in the Great Rift Valley
Bukomansimbi District